Llanfarian is a village, electoral ward and community in the district county of Ceredigion, Mid-Wales, south of the administrative centre Aberystwyth.

Llanfarian village lies above the banks of the river Ystwyth in the Ystwyth Valley. The community – which includes the villages of Rhydyfelin and Glanyrafon, and the hamlets of Chancery and Moriah – had a population of 1,541 at the 2011 census.

Amenities
Llanfarian is at the western edge of the Ystwyth Trail.

Llanfarian has one primary school, Ysgol Llanfarian. A school at Chancery is referred to in a World War II children's evacuation account.

Historical notes
The now disused and dismantled Carmarthen to Aberystwyth Line stopped here at Llanrhystud Road station.

Government

Llanfarian had a representative on Cardiganshire County Council from the formation of the authority in 1889. The first member was Morris Davies, a local farmer, who defeated Matthew Vaughan Davies of Tanybwlch by fifteen votes. Both stood as Conservative candidates. By the next election in 1892, Vaughan Davies had converted to the Liberal Party and captured the seat which he held for many years. In 1895, he was elected Member of Parliament for Cardiganshire.

Notable residents
 Matthew Vaughan Davies of Tanybwlch, landowner and politician 
 Peter Walter Davies of the Welsh Kite Trust

References

External links

 Photographs of Llanfarian – Ceredigion County Council, archived in March 2016
 Dismantled railway bridge
 Video clips of old railway in action
 Ystwyth Trail route

Villages in Ceredigion